The West Derby is a match between the fierce rivals SSU Politehnica Timișoara and UTA Arad, the biggest and most popular football clubs in the western of Romania.

History and context 

At first glance, the reasons for rivalry between Timișoara and Arad are multiple. At first sight, it is the rivalry between the cities, both with a rich economic and cultural activity. Then it would be the postwar period, when, in administratively terms, Arad destiny was decided by Timișoara. In football, the two cities dispute the status of pioneer in the Romanian football. All these aspects have contributed to today's enmity, between Poli and UTA. A decisive episode, however, was consumed in 1964.

The flame that lit irreversible the rivalry between Poli and UTA was the match from 16 May 1964 in Timișoara. Both teams were hungry for points and the pressure was greater on the shoulders of Timișoara players, who were in a tough situation, the bottom of the table. Over 25,000 spectators stormed the new stadium on May 16, a stadium that was not completely built.

On UTA's bench was Coloman Braun-Bogdan aka "Csibi", coach that a year before finished in 3rd place with Timișoara. After a quarrel with Remus Lazăr and Nelu Igna, it has been removed from the team and took over UTA. So it is understandable that the famous coach has to pay some "debts".

"Csibi not come alone, but with the referee Lulu Mihăilescu. They have scored a goal from offside, led us, and when we equalized at 3–3, Lereter scored, but the referee cancelled the goal. When people saw that, they triggered the scandal", remember, many years ago, Cicerone Manolache, one of the protagonists of that match. Then followed a bombing rocks on the lockers. The police intervened, but viewers could not be calmed so easy. Witnesses said that one of the police cars was overthrown by Druckers (Poli fans). The whole incident was left with arrests and expulsions for students who actively participated in the scandal.

Timișoara stadium was suspended, they disputed their last home matches in exile, at Reșița. At the end of that edition of the championship, Știința Timișoara relegated.

In the last 20 years, both teams faced financial problems, so the meetings between them becoming rarer, but perhaps more explosive. Firstly FC Politehnica Timișoara, it was the one who had financial problems in the early 2000s. Then Timișoara recovered and returns in the first league through an alliance with AEK București, they became for a short period Politehnica AEK Timișoara. But 2000s did not have to be gentle with their great rival, UTA Arad, as well. They played mostly in the second league except the moment when promoted instead of Liberty Salonta, which promoted on the pitch, but sold its place. Then in the early 2010s, both teams arrived in the second league. Then in 2012 FC Politehnica Timișoara went bankrupt and it was followed by her biggest rival UTA Arad, two years later, in 2014. If at Arad the team started from Liga IV, being supported by everyone and holding the old team record and logo, at Timișoara things had to be more complicated. After the dissolution of FC Politehnica Timișoara in 2012, appeared 2 teams. ACS Poli Timișoara, former ACS Recaș which was moved from Recaș to Timișoara and inheriting the old team record, a team that is supported by local authorities. The second one is SSU Politehnica Timișoara, a team supported by the fans of Poli (Druckeria), who started its road from Liga V. UTA fans consider SSU Politehnica Timișoara as their real rival because it is supported by FC Politehnica Timișoara fans.

On 13 November 2016, UTA and Poli met again, for the first time in this new format. The match end draw but UTA Arad had possession and occasions. Even though UTA controlled the match from the beginning to end, Poli managed to score the opening goal. Later, UTA scored and the match ended 1-1.

Statistics

Meetings 

All-known meetings:

Notes:
 UTA Arad won the match disputed on 24 April 2018 by (forfait), after SSU Politehnica Timișoara players have retired from the pitch in the 62nd minute, at the score of 0-0, as a protest for the fact that only 70 supporters of Politehnica were allowed on the stadium.

References

External links
 romaniansoccer.ro

Football rivalries in Romania
Football in Romania
FC Politehnica Timișoara
FC UTA Arad
1948 establishments in Romania